X Brands (July 24, 1927 – May 8, 2000), sometimes credited as "Jay X. Brands", was an American actor of German ancestry known for his roles on various television series and in some films between 1956 and the late 1970s. His best-known recurring character is Pahoo-Ka-Ta-Wah ("Wolf Who Stands In Water"), the shotgun-toting American Indian on Yancy Derringer, a 1958-1959 CBS series set in post-Civil War New Orleans and starring Jock Mahoney in the title role.

Early life
Born in Kansas City, Missouri, Jay X Brands was the youngest of three children of Pansy H. (née Allen) and William G. Brands. By 1940 Jay had relocated with his family to Glendale, California, where his father worked as a general contractor. There the Brands lived only 11 miles (18 km) from Hollywood, and over time "X" became interested in film work, later finding employment as a stuntman as well as minor acting roles.

Brands' unusual use of a lone alphabetic character as a name derives from his family's history. In the small town in Germany where his ancestors once resided, there were two men named Jan Brands. One of them adopted the middle initial "X" to distinguish himself from the other Jan. He became known as "X" Brands, and the name continued to be used by his descendants who immigrated to America. In keeping with family tradition, no Brands could use the initial until the previous "X" had died.

Although X Brands was of European ancestry, his portrayals of Native Americans in film and television roles earned praise for their authenticity. Brummett Echohawk, a spokesman for the Pawnee Indians, wrote a letter to Hollywood producers in which he commended Brands for his authentic performance and his ability at speaking the tribe's language.

Films
During his film career, Brands invariably served as supporting characters, often in uncredited roles, performing in at least 13 films between 1956 and 1978. His most noteworthy roles are as "Hook" in Santee, starring Glenn Ford, and as "Vallejo" in the third remake of Beau Geste (1966).

Television

Best-known role
The television series Yancy Derringer stars Jock Mahoney and consists of 34 episodes, which originally aired weekly from October 1958 through June 1959. The series' storyline is set in New Orleans just after the end of the Civil War in 1865. X Brands plays "Pahoo-Ka-Ta-Wah," a tall Pawnee Indian who carries a double-barrel shotgun and is Derringer's (Mahoney's) constant companion and protector. Pahoo's loyalty and overriding concern for Derringer's welfare began after he saved Yancy's life. In the series' pilot episode, "Return to New Orleans", Yancy recounts that act; and explains that by saving his life, Pahoo believes "he went against fate" and "therefore he's responsible for my life from now on." Also, throughout the series, Brands' Pawnee character is silent, never uttering a word. Whenever Yancy does speak to him, Pahoo uses only sign language—hand gestures—to communicate.

Other notable roles
In 1956, two years before he began work on Yancy Derringer, Brands appeared in different roles in 15 episodes of the syndicated Western series Judge Roy Bean, featuring Edgar Buchanan, Jack Buetel, and Jackie Loughery.  His other television appearances in the role of a guest star include series such as Crossroads, Cheyenne, Annie Oakley, Gunsmoke (1975 as a Chief in “The Squaw”), The Tall Man, Daniel Boone, Mission: Impossible, The High Chaparral, Laredo, Alias Smith and Jones, Bonanza, Wagon Train, The Rifleman, Rawhide, and Broken Arrow. Although most of his roles are of that genre, he does not always appear as Indians in Westerns . Brands, for example, appears in the speaking role of "Yancey" in an episode of Sergeant Preston of the Yukon, a popular adventure series in the late 1950s. Later, on the NBC espionage series, The Man from U.N.C.L.E., he portrays, yet again, a Native American in a 1966 episode titled, "The Indian Affairs Affair".

Brands can also be seen in a rare talking role as trail boss Jeb Mitchell in a 1960 episode on NBC's Bat Masterson. He has another speaking role in the ABC/Warner Brothers series, Cheyenne, in the episode, "Massacre At Gunsight Pass", portraying the Indian leader, "Powderface". He plays  rogue Indian "Sharp Tongue" in a speaking role on the season six episode of Bonanza, "A Far, Far Better Thing".  He has a speaking role as well in a 1970 episode of NBC's police series, Adam-12, in which he plays Officer Sanchez.

Personal life and death
X Brands was married three times. On October 3, 1946, while serving as an electrician's mate in the United States Navy, he wed 16-year-old California native Suzan Harriet Edwards in Los Angeles. Though the duration of their union is undetermined, it appears to have been brief; in 1950 he married Jean Dorothy Merriam of Fort Worth, Texas. He and Merriam had two daughters, Kathleen Jean (1951-2001) and Karen Juliet (1956- ), before their marriage ended in 1961. In Los Angeles, ten years later, on August 28, 1971, Brands was married to 23-year-old Pamela M. McInnes. Los Angeles County records document that they were divorced in October 1975.

Brands died at age 72 in Northridge, California, on May 8, 2000. According to Brands' daughter Karen Juliet (Brands) Dougherty, her father's death certificate attributed his demise to sepsis, pneumonia and congestive heart failure and not to cancer as cited by some biographical references. Jay was an avid aviator and FAA Certified Instructor and Examiner.

Filmography

Film

Television

Reference and notes

External links

1927 births
2000 deaths
American male film actors
American male television actors
Male actors from Kansas City, Missouri
Male actors from Los Angeles
American people of German descent
20th-century American male actors
Western (genre) television actors